Batalhão de Operações Policiais Especiais (BOPE) (literally "Special Police Operations Battalion") or BOPE is the police tactical unit and gendarmerie of the Military Police of Rio de Janeiro State (PMERJ) in Brazil. Due to the nature of crime in favelas, BOPE units utilize equipment deemed more powerful than traditional civilian law enforcement, and have extensive experience in urban warfare as well as progression in confined and restricted environments.

BOPE of PMERJ is one of the best known units of its kind among Brazil's military police organizations. Military Police of Alagoas, Pernambuco, and Santa Catarina states also call their tactical units BOPE, while the military police of the Federal District, Piauí, and Rio Grande do Sul states call their forces "Special Operations Battalion(s)" ("Batalhão de Operações Especiais" or "BOE").

Significant roles

The BOPE Currently perform a number of roles, including:

 Providing additional security at special events;
 Break barricades constructed by drug dealers;
 Shoot to kill at any criminal threatening both civilian or member life;
 Exterminate drug trafficking criminal factions and all of its members;
 Extract police officers or civilians injured in confrontations and combats;
 Rescuing officers and citizens captured by criminals or endangered by gunfire;
 Serve high-risk arrest warrants;
 Hostage rescue;
 Stabilizing situations involving high-risk suicidal subjects;
 Suppress prison riots;
 Support civil police in combats of any kind;
 Providing superior assault firepower in certain situations;
 Armed patrols around the favelas;
 Special missions in swamps or mountainous terrains such as reconnaissance, planning and infiltration;
 Engage in combat serving state sovereignty;
 Crime suppression to a minimum;
 Resolving high-risk situations with minimal loss of life, injury, or property damage;
 Engage strongly armed criminal factions.

Weapons and vehicles

The force has a fleet of armoured fighting vehicles, which are known as "Pacificador" ("Peacemaker"), or "Caveirão" ("Big Skull") and one UH-1 Huey. These vehicles are used in operations in the slums (favelas) where BOPE face intense conflicts with heavily armed drug dealers. BOPE also operates a wheel loader in order to remove obstacles, barricades and street blockades.

BOPE soldiers are equipped with heavy armaments:

 Colt M16 rifle
 Colt M727 carbine
 Colt M4 carbine
 Armalite AR-10A4
 H&K PSG1 sniper rifle
 Benelli M3 shotgun
 FN P90
 IMBEL MD97
 H&K MP5 A2, SD3 and K
 H&K G3
 H&K 21
 Taurus PT92
 IMBEL 9mm
 FN FAL
 FN PARAFAL
 M1 carbine
 Frag grenades

Controversy

BOPE has generated notoriety due to their role in the violent drug war in the favelas of Rio de Janeiro and they have been referred to as a "Death Squad" by multiple newspapers. One aspect that has been pointed out specifically is their logo, which bears a knife in a skull over crossed pistols (popularly known in Brazil as "faca na caveira", Portuguese for "knife in the skull"). According to the official BOPE website, the knife in the skull symbolizes "victory over death" and the crossed pistols are the symbol of the military police.

A 2005 report on extra judicial executions by the New York University School of Law indicated that BOPE was involved in the deaths of 4 teenagers under the pretext that they were drug traffickers who were resisting arrest: "BOPE officers falsified the crime scene in order to incriminate the victims. Hoping this way to make them appear to be gang members. No weapon was found on any of the victims. None of them had any previous history of criminal activity."

Amnesty International declared that "the police forces in Brazil adopt violent and repressive methods. These cause violations of fundamental rights of large parts of the population on a regular basis", and attributes a certain number of killed civilians to BOPE in particular. In March 2006, Amnesty International specifically condemned the use of vans with armoured plating, known as a Caveirão. It stated that deploying the vehicle aggressively, indiscriminately targeting whole communities, highlighted the ineffectiveness of excessive use of force.

Similar named police units of the Brazilian police force

BOE or BOPE are acronyms that can refer to the following specialized military police units:
BOE (Batalhão de Operações Especiais) units:
Special Operations Battalion (PMAC) – in Acre
Special Operations Battalion (PMDF) – in the Federal District
Specials Battalion Operations (PMMT) – in the state of Mato Grosso
Special Operations Battalion (PMPR) – the state of Paraná
Special Operations Battalion (PMPI) – the state of Piauí

BOPE (Batalhão de Operações Policiais Especiais) units:
Special Police Operations Battalion (PMBA) – the state of Bahia
Special Police Operations Battalion (PMAL) – the state of Alagoas
Special Police Operations Battalion (PMRR) – in the state of Roraima
Special Police Operations Battalion (PMSC) – the state of Santa Catarina
Special Police Operations Battalion (PMERJ) – in the state of Rio de Janeiro
Special Police Operations Battalion (PMRN) – in Rio Grande do Norte state

In popular culture

In 2006, the book Elite da Tropa was published. Written by sociologist Luiz Eduardo Soares and two BOPE officers, Major André Batista and Captain Rodrigo Pimentel, it provides a semi-fictional account of the daily routine of BOPE as well as some historical events, based on the experiences of the latter two. It describes BOPE as a "killing machine" and details an alleged aborted assassination attempt by some police officers on then-governor Leonel Brizola. The book was controversial at the time of release, and reportedly resulted in Batista being reprimanded and censored by the Military Police. 
The book has been made into a movie, Tropa de Elite (Elite Squad), directed by José Padilha (the director of Bus 174), with a screenplay by Academy Award-nominated screenwriter Bráulio Mantovani. In 2010 the movie gained a sequel, Elite Squad: The Enemy Within.

Two BOPE operators make an appearance in "Tom Clancy's Rainbow Six Siege" as playable operators. These operators are Capitão (Captain) and Caveira (Skull).

OPES is a Brazilian special police unit in the online first-person shooter Crossfire. The OPES logo features a skull and a knife similar to that of the BOPE. The OPES were introduced with the release of the 2011 Brazilian release of the game.

BOPE is featured on Season 1, Episode 2 of Elite World Cops, a television show hosted by former SAS soldier and author Chris Ryan.

See also
 Military Police of Rio de Janeiro State
 Pacifying Police Unit
 GATE and ROTA (São Paulo Military Police)
 National Force of Public Safety (Brazilian federal special response unit)
 List of police tactical units
 Eastern Military Command, also known as Duque de Caxias Palace

References

External links

 BOPE Rio de Janeiro, official website, in Portuguese
 BOPE Federal District of Brasilia official website, in Portuguese
  BOPE-POI informativo sobre Unidades Operacionais Especiais das Policias Internacionais.*POLICE – POLIZIA – POLITIE -ПОЛИЦИИ – POLIZEI*

Counterterrorist organizations
Rio de Janeiro
Specialist police agencies of Brazil
Government of Rio de Janeiro (state)